Paul Nagel may refer to:
Paul C. Nagel (1926–2011), American historian
Paul Nagel (politician) (1831–1880), Swiss politician and president of the Swiss Council of States, 1876–77
Paul Nagel (mystic), see Balthasar Walther

See also 
Nagel (surname)
Paul Nagle (born 1978), Irish rally driver